Special Area No. 3 is a special area in southern Alberta, Canada. It is a rural municipality similar to a municipal district; however, the elected council is overseen by four representatives appointed by the province, the Special Areas Board.

The Blood Indian Creek Reservoir is located within Special Area 3.

Geography

Communities and localities 
 
The following urban municipalities are surrounded by Special Area No. 3.
Cities
none
Towns
Oyen
Villages
Youngstown
Summer villages
none

The following hamlets are located within Special Area No. 3.
Hamlets
Cereal
Chinook
New Brigden
Sedalia
Sibbald

The following localities are located within Special Area No. 3.
Localities 
Anatole
Benton
Benton Station
Big Stone
Cabin Lake
Calthorpe
Cappon
Dobson
Esther
Excel
Gold Spur
Helmsdale
Lanfine
Naco
Sunnydale
Wastina

Demographics 

See also 
List of communities in Alberta
List of improvement districts in Alberta
List of municipal districts in Alberta
List of municipalities in Alberta

References

External links 

 
1959 establishments in Alberta
Special areas in Alberta